Granite Mountain may refer to:

Mountains

Canada
Granite Mountain (British Columbia), in the Rossland Range of the Monashee Mountains

United States
Granite Mountain (Arizona), in Yavapai County
Granite Mountain (Arkansas), near Little Rock
Granite Mountain (California), in Anza-Borrego Desert State Park
Granite Mountain (Texas), in Burnet County
Granite Mountain (Salt Lake County, Utah), in the Wasatch Range
Granite Mountain (Washington), several peaks, including:
Granite Mountain (King County, Washington)
Granite Mountain (Wenatchee Mountains)
Granite Mountain (Whatcom County, Washington)

Settlements
Granite Mountain, Alaska, a place in Alaska
Granite Mountain Air Station
Granite Mountain, a neighborhood in Little Rock, Arkansas

Other uses
Granite Mountain charter school, Lucerne Valley, California, US
Only the Brave (2017 film) (working title Granite Mountain), an American film

See also
Granite Mountains (disambiguation)
Granite Peak, several mountains in North America